Fuel is an American rock band formed in Harrisburg, Pennsylvania, by guitarist-songwriter Carl Bell in 1989. They are known for their hit songs "Shimmer" from the album Sunburn, "Hemorrhage (In My Hands)" and "Bad Day" from the album Something Like Human, as well as "Falls on Me" from the album Natural Selection. The band has numerous top 10 Billboard rock hits, multiple videos in heavy rotation on MTV, numerous live network TV performances in the US, Canada, and Australia, platinum singles in Australia in addition to the US, and numerous songs on film soundtracks such as Scream 3, Daredevil, and Godzilla. The album Sunburn is certified platinum by the RIAA, and the album Something Like Human is certified double-platinum.

In 2013, "Hemorrhage (In My Hands)" became the No. 6 Alternative Rock song of the past 25 years according to Billboards Alternative Chart 25th Anniversary: Top 100 Songs.

History

Early years (1989–1997)
What would become Fuel was formed in 1989 in the western Tennessee town of Kenton when childhood friends Carl Bell and Jeff Abercrombie began playing music together in junior high school and played in various garage bands. After graduating high school, Bell (who was a few years older than Abercrombie) headed to college where he met drummer Jody Abbott. Bell and Abbott formed a college campus band, Wanted (along with Robert Wagner and Mark Crawford), in Henderson, Tennessee. The band Wanted transitioned into Phoenix, which was a touring band for the college primarily used to recruit prospective students. After college, Bell and Abercrombie, who at the time was attending college at the University of Tennessee at Martin, reunited with Abbott and formed the band Reel Too Real, playing cover songs at local clubs in Tennessee and eventually becoming a national touring club circuit band. Bassist Jeff Abercrombie saw vocalist-guitarist Brett Scallions performing in a bar in Jackson, Tennessee, in 1992 and later recruited him to join in early 1993. Keyboardist Erik Avakian joined the group in 1993. During this time, Carl played guitar and provided backing vocals, Jeff played bass, Jody was on drums, Brett played guitar and sang lead vocals, and Erik played keyboards and shared singing duties on various songs. That same year, the band moved to Harrisburg, Pennsylvania, where they performed at local Pennsylvania bars & nightclubs under the name Reel Too Real, playing cover songs. The band made a choice to perform under a different name when showcasing its own original material. That name, for the time being, would be Small the Joy, which produced one self-released EP, a self-titled cassette tape, in 1994. The band then once again decided to change its name, this time settling on the name Fuel, before self-releasing their second EP, Porcelain, in 1996 as well as repackaging their first EP, Small the Joy, with the "Fuel" name on it. There were several names on a shortlist, but in the end, Fuel was the name everyone agreed on. Erik played keyboards and sang backing vocals before leaving the band in 1994. Porcelain sold well locally, spawning a small local radio hit with "Shimmer" even before being signed to a major label. The popularity of the EP brought them to the attention of Sony's 550 imprint, which released their third EP, Hazleton, the following year, 1998.

Mainstream success (1998–2003)
Upon signing to Epic, the band entered Longview Farm recording studios in Massachusetts, along with producer Steven Haigler and session drummer Jonathan Mover due to problems with Abbott. The band's full-length debut, Sunburn, came out in 1998. "Shimmer" was again included and peaked at No. 2 on the Billboard Modern Rock Tracks charts, No. 11 on the Mainstream Rock Tracks chart, No. 37 on the Adult Top 40 chart and at No. 42 on the Billboard Hot 100, while the other singles ("Bittersweet", "Jesus or a Gun" and "Sunburn") received some airplay. The songs "Shimmer" and "Sunburn" are also featured on the charitable album Live in the X Lounge. "Sunburn" was also featured in the movie Scream 3, and the band contributed the non-LP track "Walk the Sky" to the 1998 American Godzilla film. The band hit the road in support of the release. Kevin Miller joined the band as the drummer, coming from the Lehigh Valley, Pennsylvania-based bar band The Armadillos. Liner notes for the cassette and CD issues of "Sunburn" list the band members as Carl Bell (guitar), Brett Scallions (vocals), Jeff Abercrombie (bass), and Kevin Miller (drums), although Jonathan Mover is credited with playing all the drums and percussion on the record. The band picture includes Miller, though he did not play on the record. The album Sunburn was the band's first Gold and Platinum selling record.

In 2000, Fuel returned with their second album, Something Like Human, featuring the single "Hemorrhage (In My Hands)" which was No. 1 for 12 weeks on the U.S. Modern Rock Tracks chart. The single was also named Billboards No. 5 Rock Song of the Decade according to their Best of the 2000s Rock Songs chart. In 2013 "Hemorrhage (In My Hands)" became the No. 6 Alternative Rock song of the past 25 years according to Billboards Alternative Chart 25th Anniversary: Top 100 Songs. Something Like Human peaked at No. 17 on the Billboard 200 and was certified Double Platinum by the RIAA on September 25, 2001.

The group's third album, Natural Selection, named after Darwinian theory, was released in September 2003 and debuted at No. 15 on the U.S. Billboard charts. The extended lag time between Something Like Human and Natural Selection was due to legal problems and lead singer Scallions having to recover from surgery to repair a deviated septum he suffered from an on-stage collision with Bell. The album spawned the hit "Falls on Me", which hit No. 9 and No. 11 on the Mainstream Rock Tracks and the Modern Rock Tracks charts, and reaching No. 13 and No. 17 on the Mainstream Top 40 and Adult Top 40 charts, peaking at No. 52 on the U.S. Billboard Hot 100. The album was nominated for a Grammy Award in 2004 for best engineered album, and the band contributed the song "Won't Back Down" to the Daredevil soundtrack earlier in the year. They released their greatest hits album The Best of Fuel on December 13, 2005. Their song "Quarter" was featured in the games Need for Speed: Underground, NFL Street, and NASCAR Thunder 2004.

Line-up changes and Angels & Devils (2004–2007)
After disagreements (both public and private), drummer Kevin Miller was dismissed from the band in 2004. On February 7, 2006, Fuel announced through their website singer Brett Scallions had left the band. Fuel had already laid the instrumental tracks for their fourth album and soon began auditioning singers so the band could move forward. Abercrombie and Bell took notice of American Idol contestant Chris Daughtry, after he performed "Hemorrhage (In My Hands)" on the show. The single achieved the iTunes Top 10 download list, remaining a number of days and sparking interest in other Fuel songs, which began to appear on the iTunes Top 100 download chart. On March 3, 2006, American Idol judge Randy Jackson stated in an interview Daughtry had been offered the opportunity to become Fuel's new lead singer. Fuel confirmed their interest on their official website as well as interviews appearing on CNN Entertainment Tonight. On May 11, 2006, Abercrombie and Bell appeared on the TV show Extra to officially offer Daughtry the job. However, though flattered, Daughtry turned down this offer. By this time also, Tommy Stewart, formerly of Godsmack, was named on Fuel's Myspace page as Fuel's drummer.

On June 8, 2006, Bell announced the band had found a new lead singer but was awaiting confirmation from the record label to announce it. Still, they officially entered the studio in mid-August with producer Scott Humphrey to start recording their fourth album. Due to other commitments Stewart was not available to play drums on the album, so Tommy Lee and Josh Freese performed drums in his place. The band posted photos from the studio fairly often on the band's website and MySpace.

On March 9, 2007, Carl Bell officially announced Fuel's next album, complete with new band members, was fully mixed and going to mastering, and on April 19, 2007, he posted on Fuel's official website their new lead singer was Toryn Green.

On May 15, 2007, Bell announced the title of the new album—Angels & Devils. On June 19, 2007, Fuel's first single from their new album, "Wasted Time", was released into rock radio and internet download, peaking at No. 24 on Billboard's Hot Mainstream Rock Tracks. The album was released on August 7, 2007. A second single, "Gone", was released on October 23. Angels & Devils debuted on the Billboard 200 at No. 42, selling roughly 15,000 copies in its first week. On October 20, 2008, Sony's catalog division Legacy Recordings released the album Playlist: The Very Best of Fuel on their Playlist series.

The return of Brett Scallions and Puppet Strings (2010–2020)

On April 8, 2010, the reformation of Fuel was confirmed in an official press release. The band consisted of Scallions with an entirely new lineup.

"There is only one original of anything," says Scallions, "and that includes Fuel. The original lineup with Carl, Jeff, Jody, and myself will always be something special to all of us, and our first Fuelies (a term for Fuel fans) but it has been thirteen years since the original lineup was intact, and since then many great musicians have come and gone. The lineup I put together for Fuel is not meant to replace or diminish what any of the original members created. Just the opposite, it is to give our fans a live destination and to keep the Fuel name alive for a new generation to discover. Maybe someday we'll all get on the same page and play together again, but life happens, and the next thing you know you just can't jump on a bus and take off for a month, let alone a year."

It was later announced on June 25, 2010, former Shinedown guitarist Jasin Todd had joined the band to replace Yogi Lonich on lead guitar. Lonich returned to the band in January 2011. Todd left the band on good terms.

In March 2011, Brett Scallions started a new band called World Fire Brigade. The group was a writing team of Brett Scallions, Eddie Wohl, and Smile Empty Soul's Sean Danielsen. Scallions and Danielsen shared vocal duties, Danielsen played guitar parts, Scallions played bass, and Ken Schalk performed all drum tracks. Guest guitar solos were contributed by Rob Caggiano of Volbeat, Andy Andersson who played with Scallions in Fuel during the Puppet Strings era, and Mike McCready of Pearl Jam.

The re-formed Fuel performed at The Bamboozle in East Rutherford, New Jersey, on May 1, 2011.

The band played Bethlehem Musikfest alongside Buckcherry, however, Yogi Lonich was not on stage. A friend of Scallions, Martin Estrada, filled in for the show. Brett Scallions announced on his official Facebook page that Yogi Lonich and Scallions were parting ways amicably and it was best for Fuel to search for a replacement. Scallions also hinted there to be new music in the works and also introduced the band's new lead guitarist, Andy Andersson. The band continued its tour and played new material during their shows.

Fuel entered the studio on March 8, 2012, to record their fifth full-length studio album, Puppet Strings. Eddie Wohl, co-producer of the World Fire Brigade album alongside Scallions and Danielsen, co-produced the new Fuel album with Scallions. In late September, the band re-entered the studio to complete the guitar and bass tracks for the record. As of February 2013, the band was still in the studio finishing vocal & guitar tracks. Originally planned for a 2012 release, the album had been pushed back to a possible mid-2013 release. This marked six years since the band released their previous album Angels & Devils.

On April 30, 2013, drummer Ken Schalk announced his departure from the band to spend more time with his family. On that same day, Scallions announced new drummer Bryan "Keelgood" Keeling, formerly of the band Mr. Rocket Baby. The band, however, kept Schalk's drum tracks, as referenced by Keeling in his first interview since joining the band. On April 30, 2013, Brett Scallions announced a new Fuel single was targeted for a mid-summer release via download once the "details have been worked out and handshakes have been made".

On June 26, 2013, Scallions announced that Bryan Keeling was going out on tour with Eric Sardinas in Europe and that Shannon Boone (current drummer for Puddle of Mudd) had joined the band. Scallions also commented on the new album; "The record has been recorded and is so close to being released for all of you I can taste it. There will be big announcements very soon regarding release dates, singles, videos, and much much more. Take care and we will see you all soon at a venue near you!"

Scallions confirmed the new album was mixed by Ben Grosse who also collaborated with Fuel on Something Like Human. According to Scallions, the new album was currently in the mastering stage of production.

It was announced through Guitar World on December 5, 2013, the album indeed titled, Puppet Strings, would be released on March 4, 2014. Puppet Strings debuted at #1 on the rock charts, the band's first number one since Something Like Human. The song, "Yeah!", was released for free download on the website as well, although it was believed to be the first single, Scallions stated it is not the first single but rather a "teaser". The first single, "Soul to Preach To" was released in late January 2014.

In May 2015, as Fuel geared up to join Everclear on their Summerland Tour, ex-Filter bass player Phil Buckman temporarily replaced Brad Stewart, with Stewart himself filling in for the band Saliva. Although Brad stated he was scheduled to re-join Fuel on June 9, the temporary switch proved to be permanent with Stewart continuing his new role in Saliva, as did Buckman with Fuel.

Scallions made many posts on Facebook and Instagram of him working in the studio on new material. It was later announced it was to be released as solo material. The band toured the US in August and September 2017 and toured Australia and New Zealand in December 2017. Fuel toured throughout 2018, playing Sunburn in its entirety to commemorate its 20th anniversary.

On October 21, 2020, Scallions officially announced his departure from Fuel in a Facebook post :

Since his departure from Fuel, Scallions has made several posts regarding his new project called Melody Brothers. Release is planned for sometime in 2022.

Bell and Miller's return, Anomaly, Death of Jody Abbott and Corsale's departure (2020–present) 

In 2020, founding member and primary songwriter Carl Bell decided to return to the band, forming a new version of group. According to Bell, this was more or less a rebirth of Fuel and a new era for the band. Bell reunited with former drummer Kevin Miller to reform the group. Together they recruited a new singer, John Corsale, who at the time was the frontman for Miller's band Smashed. They began rehearsing in summer of 2020, and later began working on what would become Fuel's 6th full-length album. During that time, the band also released Something Like Human on vinyl for the first time.
Anomaly, was released on October 22, 2021. Bell wrote and performed all instruments on Anomaly with Corsale performing vocals. Bell also produced and mixed the album. The first single, "Hard", was released on July 9. The album's second single, "Don't Say I", was released on August 20, 2021.
On July 20, 2022, original drummer Jody Abbott died of Huntington's Disease at age 55 after living with the disease for multiple years. 
In October 2022 John Corsale was fired from the band. He was later replaced by Aaron Scott

Band members

Current members
 Carl Bell – lead guitar, backing vocals (1989–2010, 2020–present)
 Kevin Miller – drums (1998–2004, 2020–present)
 Mark Klotz – guitar, backing vocals (2020–present)
 Tommy Nat – bass (2020–present)

Former members
 Brett Scallions – lead vocals, rhythm guitar (1993–2006, 2010–2020)
 Jeff Abercrombie – bass (1989–2010)
 Jody Abbott – drums (1989–1998) (died 2022)
 Erik Avakian – keyboards, backing vocals (1993–1994)
 Toryn Green – lead vocals (2006–2010)
 Tommy Stewart – drums (2004–2010)
 Ken Schalk – drums (2010–2013)
 Brad Stewart – bass (2010–2015)
 Andy Andersson – lead guitar, backing vocals (2011–2015)
 John Corsale – lead vocals, rhythm guitar (2020–2022)

Touring Members
 Aaron Scott – lead vocals, rhythm guitar (2022–present)
 Yogi Lonich – lead guitar, backing vocals (2010, 2011) 
 Phil Buckman – bass, backing vocals (2015–2020)
 Bryan Keeling – drums (2013)
 Shannon Boone – drums (2013–2020)
 Jason Womack – lead guitar, backing vocals (2015–2020)
 Jasin Todd – lead guitar (2010–2011)
 Ronny Paige – bass (2007–2008)

Timeline

Discography

Studio albums
 Sunburn (1998)
 Something Like Human (2000)
 Natural Selection (2003)
 Angels & Devils (2007)
 Puppet Strings (2014)
 Anomaly (2021)

Notes

References

External links

 

American post-grunge musical groups
American alternative metal musical groups
Hard rock musical groups from Pennsylvania
Musical groups established in 1989
550 Music artists
1989 establishments in Tennessee